West Ocean Condominiums 2 is a residential high-rise in Long Beach, California, United States. The building is one of two high-rises in its complex, with the other being West Ocean Condominiums 1, which is  taller. The modernist building contains 21 storeys. Amenities include 24-hour security, a club house, fitness center, pool and spa, and wine storage room.

See also
List of tallest buildings in Long Beach

References

Residential condominiums in the United States
Residential skyscrapers in California
Skyscrapers in Long Beach, California